Prairie Gunsmoke is a 1942 American Western film directed by Lambert Hillyer and written by Fred Myton. The film stars Wild Bill Elliott, Tex Ritter, Frank Mitchell, Virginia Carroll, Hal Price and Tris Coffin. The film was released on July 16, 1942, by Columbia Pictures.

Plot

Cast          
Wild Bill Elliott as Wild Bill Hickok
Tex Ritter as Tex Terrell
Frank Mitchell as Cannonball
Virginia Carroll as Lucy Wade
Hal Price as Henry Wade
Tris Coffin as Jim Kelton
Joe McGuinn as Spike Allen
Frosty Royce as Sam
Rick Anderson as Dan Whipple

References

External links
 

1942 films
American Western (genre) films
1942 Western (genre) films
Columbia Pictures films
Films directed by Lambert Hillyer
American black-and-white films
1940s English-language films
1940s American films